Friesburg is an unincorporated community located within Alloway Township, in Salem County, in the U.S. state of New Jersey. It was founded in 1748 and previously contained a post office, creamery, general store, sawmill, and blacksmith.

Friesburg is named after Jacob Fries who donated the land for the site of the Emanuel Lutheran Church, and who is also buried on the grounds.

References

Alloway Township, New Jersey
Unincorporated communities in Salem County, New Jersey
Unincorporated communities in New Jersey
Populated places established in 1748
1748 establishments in New Jersey